The second season of Burmese reality talent show The Voice Myanmar premiered on February 24, 2019 on MRTV-4. Kyar Pauk, Ni Ni Khin Zaw, Yan Yan Chan and new coach R Zarni were coaches for this season.

Blind auditions
The first episode of the Blind auditions premiered on February 24, 2019.

Color key

Episode 1 (Feb. 24)

Episode 2 (Mar. 3)

Episode 3 (Mar. 10)

Episode 4 (Mar. 17)

Episode 5 (Mar. 24)

Episode 6 (Mar. 31)

The Battles 
The Battle Rounds were broadcast from Sunday, April 7, 2019, to Sunday, May 5, 2019. Season 1 didn't use 'Steal' and this is first season of using the 'Steal'.

Color key:

The Knockouts 
The Knockout Rounds were broadcast from Sunday, May 12, 2019, to Sunday, May 19, 2019. Season 1 didn't use The Knockouts and this is the first season of The Knockout Round.

Color key:

Live shows
The live shows were aired on May 26.

Color key

Week 1: 1st Live shows  (May.26)

Week 2: 2nd Live shows  (June.2)

Week 3: Live shows semi-finals (June.9)

Week 4: Finale (June.16)

References

The Voice Myanmar